Timema douglasi is a stick insect native to northern California and southern Oregon. It was first identified in 1996 as a specialist feeder on old-growth Douglas fir. It is one of five parthenogenetic species of Timema.

References

Phasmatodea
Insects described in 1996